Leopoldine Marie, Princess of Anhalt-Dessau (12 December 1716, in Dessau – 27 January 1782, in Kołobrzeg) was the ninth child of Prince Leopold I of Anhalt-Dessau and his wife, Anna Louise Föhse. She married on 13 February 1739 the last margrave Frederick Henry of Brandenburg-Schwedt (1709-1788).  After 1788, her Schwedt Castle was used by the Prussian royal family as a summer residence.

Issue 
She had two daughters:
 Louise (10 August 1750 – 20 December 1811), who married her cousin Prince Leopold III of Anhalt-Dessau (10 August 1740 – 9 August 1817).
 Friederike Charlotte (18 August 1745 – 23 January 1808), the last Abbess of Herford Abbey

1716 births
1782 deaths
18th-century German people
Princesses of Anhalt-Dessau
Daughters of monarchs